"Ain't Had No Lovin'" is a single by American country music artist Connie Smith.  Released in May 1966, the song reached #2 on the Billboard Hot Country Singles chart. The single was later issued onto Smith's second album of the year, Born to Sing.

Chart performance

References

1966 singles
Connie Smith songs
Songs written by Dallas Frazier
Song recordings produced by Bob Ferguson (musician)
1966 songs
RCA Victor singles